Wellawaya Divisional Secretariat is a  Divisional Secretariat  of Moneragala District, of Uva Province, Sri Lanka. The Division joined the Global Age Friendly Cities Network in December 2012.

References
 Divisional Secretariats Portal

Divisional Secretariats of Moneragala District